This is a list of priority disputes in science and science-related fields (such as mathematics).

Mathematics 

Rule for solving cubic equations: Niccolò Tartaglia, Gerolamo Cardano
Calculus: Isaac Newton, Gottfried Leibniz (see Newton v. Leibniz calculus controversy)

Physics 

Radio waves: James Clerk Maxwell, Oliver Lodge, Heinrich Hertz, David Edward Hughes
Relativity: Albert Einstein, David Hilbert, Henri Poincaré (see relativity priority dispute)
Quark model: Murray Gell-Mann, Yuval Ne'eman

Astronomy 

Haumea: José Luis Ortiz Moreno et al., Michael E. Brown et al.
Sunspots: Galileo, Christoph Scheiner
Geoheliocentric system: Tycho Brahe, Nicolaus Raimarus Ursus
Galilean moons: Galileo, Simon Marius
Prediction of Neptune: Urbain Le Verrier, John Couch Adams

Chemistry 

Oxygen: Joseph Priestley, Carl Wilhelm Scheele, Antoine Laurent Lavoisier
Chemical bond: Edward Frankland, Friedrich August Kekule, Archibald Scott Couper

Biology and medicine 

Evolution: Charles Darwin, Alfred Russel Wallace, Patrick Matthew
Opiate receptor: Candace Pert, Solomon H. Snyder
DNA structure: Francis Crick, James D. Watson, Rosalind Franklin, Erwin Chargaff, Oswald Avery
Lymphatic system: Olof Rudbeck, Thomas Bartholin
Blood transfusion: Richard Lower, Henry Oldenburg, Jean-Baptiste Denis
Life cycle of malarial parasite: Giovanni Battista Grassi, Ronald Ross
Magnetic resonance imaging (MRI): Paul Lauterbur, Peter Mansfield, Raymond Vahan Damadian, and others (see 2003 Nobel Prize)
HIV: Robert Gallo, Luc Montagnier
Teaching a mute deaf person to speak: John Wallis, William Holder

Technology 

Watch balance spring: Robert Hooke, Christiaan Huygens
Light bulb: Joseph Swan, Thomas Edison
Telephone: Johann Philipp Reis, Antonio Meucci, Alexander Graham Bell, Elisha Gray (see Elisha Gray and Alexander Bell controversy)
Incandescent light bulb: Thomas Edison, Joseph Swan
Radio: Oliver Lodge, Jagadish Chandra Bose, Reginald Fessenden, Guglielmo Marconi,  Roberto Landell de Moura, Alexander Popov, Nikola Tesla (see invention of radio)
Electronic television: Philo T. Farnsworth, Vladimir Zworykin (see history of television)
Claims to the first powered flight: Shivkar Bapuji Talpade in the Marutsakhā (1895), Clément Ader in the Avion III (1897), Gustave Whitehead in his No's. 21 and 22 aeroplanes (1901–1903), Richard Pearse in his monoplane (1903–1904), Samuel Pierpont Langley's Aerodrome A (1903), Karl Jatho in Jatho biplane (1903), The Wright brothers in the Wright Flyer (1903), Alberto Santos-Dumont in the 14 Bis (1906)

See also
 List of examples of Stigler's law
 Nobel Prize controversies
 List of multiple discoveries

History of science
Science-related lists
Discovery and invention controversies